The United Nations Command Military Armistice Commission (UNCMAC) was established in July 1953 at the end of the Korean War to supervise the Korean Armistice Agreement, and which has been operating ever since.

History
The United Nations Command, established under the mandate of UN Security Council 84, represents the world's first attempt at collective security under the UN system.  The UN Command campaign to repel the Democratic People's Republic of Korea (DPRK)'s armed attack against the Republic of Korea (ROK) did not result in a concluded peace, but an interim Armistice Agreement meant to establish the conditions necessary for achieving lasting peace through diplomatic means. 

The parties to conflict established the Military Armistice Commission (MAC) to manage implementation of the terms of Armistice, to investigate alleged violations, to serve as an intermediary between the commanders of the opposing sides, and to settle through negotiation any violations of the Armistice Agreement.  The MAC is a combined organization consisting of ten senior military officers: five through UNC Commander appointment and five appointed by the commanders of the KPA and CPV. 

The Armistice Agreement also established Secretariats on both sides to assist the MAC, as directed.  The Secretariats continue to operate today and maintain a 24/7/365 line of communication to support maintenance of the terms of Armistice.

The first meeting of the MAC convened on 28 July 1953, with representatives from the UNC, Korean People's Army, and Chinese People's Volunteers.  By 1991, the UNC Commander decided that timing was appropriate to designate a ROK military officer as the UNC's Senior Member to the MAC and as the Commander's lead delegate for maintenance and enforcement of the Korean Armistice Agreement.  The decision came in part to facilitate inter-Korean engagement at a time when the two governments were seeking rapprochement.  By then, the MAC had met over 450 times, but the KPA refused to hold any further MAC meetings with a ROK officer as the Senior Member.  By 1994, the CPV formally removed its delegates from the MAC, though the KPA maintains a delegation within the Joint Security Area in Panmunjeom.  All the while, UNC has maintained its position that its lead delegate for the Commission should be a ROK officer.

The UNC Commander continues to appoint five individuals to the MAC.  The current composition is one ROK Major General as Senior Member, one U.S. Major General, one British Brigadier, one ROK Brigadier General, and one rotating (on a six-month basis) Senior Officer from other countries (Australia, Belgium, Canada, Colombia, France, New Zealand, Philippines, Thailand, Turkey) that maintain liaison with the UNC.  The Senior Member continues to play an important role in Armistice maintenance and enforcement, including the issuance of directives for special investigations in response to alleged Armistice violations.

See also
UNCOK – the UN Commission on Korea
UNCURK – the UN Commission for the Unification and Rehabilitation of Korea
Neutral Nations Supervisory Commission – the international Korean Armistice Agreement monitoring entity

References

External links
 

United Nations operations in Asia
Korean Demilitarized Zone
North Korea–South Korea border
Aftermath of the Korean War
1953 establishments in Korea